Mika Antero Laitinen (born 5 April 1973) is Finnish former ski jumper who competed from 1990 to 2000.

Career
He won a gold medal in the Team large hill competition at the 1992 Winter Olympics in Albertville.

His biggest successes were at the FIS Nordic World Ski Championships, where he won three medals, including two golds in the Team large hill event (1995, 1997) and a bronze in the Individual normal hill (1995).

In the 1995/96 World Cup season, Laitinen dominated the first part of the season and won five of the nine events, until he fell and injured himself during a practice jump in Garmisch-Partenkirchen.

World Cup

Standings

Wins

External links
 
 

1973 births
Living people
People from Kuopio
Finnish male ski jumpers
Ski jumpers at the 1992 Winter Olympics
Ski jumpers at the 1998 Winter Olympics
Olympic medalists in ski jumping
FIS Nordic World Ski Championships medalists in ski jumping
Medalists at the 1992 Winter Olympics
Olympic gold medalists for Finland
Olympic ski jumpers of Finland
Sportspeople from North Savo
20th-century Finnish people